Boller House was a historic home located at Boonville, Cooper County, Missouri. It was built about 1835, and was a two-story, five bay, Classic Revival style brick, timber, and wood-frame dwelling.  It consisted of a front block with rear ell and featured a two-story front portico. It has been demolished.

It was listed on the National Register of Historic Places in 1977.

References

Houses on the National Register of Historic Places in Missouri
Neoclassical architecture in Missouri
Houses completed in 1835
Houses in Cooper County, Missouri
National Register of Historic Places in Cooper County, Missouri
1835 establishments in Missouri
Demolished buildings and structures in Missouri
Boonville, Missouri